Ferdinand Freiherr von Richthofen (5 May 18336 October 1905), better known in English as  was a German traveller, geographer, and scientist. He is noted for coining the terms "Seidenstraße" and "Seidenstraßen" = "Silk Road(s)" or "Silk Route(s)" in 1877. He also standardized the practices of chorography and chorology. He was an uncle of the World War I flying ace Manfred von Richthofen, best known as the "Red Baron".

Biography
Ferdinand von Richthofen was born in Pokój, at that time called Carlsruhe in Prussian Silesia. He was educated in the Roman Catholic Gymnasium in Breslau.

He studied Medicine at the University of Breslau and at the Humboldt University of Berlin. He traveled or studied in the Alps of Tyrol and the Carpathians in Transylvania. 

In 1860, he joined the Eulenburg Expedition, a Prussian expedition which visited Ceylon, Japan, Taiwan, Celebes, Java, the Philippines, Siam, Burma between 1860 and 1862. No important work resulted from these travels, for much of Richthofen's records and collections was lost. China was at the time inaccessible owing to the Taiping rebellion, but Richthofen was impressed with the desirability of exploring it. 
From 1862 to 1868, he worked as a geologist in the United States, discovering goldfields in California. He then followed up his interest in China by several more trips there, and also to Japan, Burma, and Java. In China he located the dried-up lake bed of Lopnur.

He published his geographical, geological, economic, and ethnological findings in three volumes with an atlas, which, however, did not cover the entire field or complete the author's plan. This work appeared at Berlin in 1877-85 under the title of China: Ergebnisse eigener Reisen und darauf gegründeter Studien. In this standard work, the author deals not only with geology but with every subject necessary to a general geographical treatise. Notably he paid close attention to the economic resources of the country he traversed. He also wrote a valuable series of letters to the Shanghai Chamber of Commerce, and first drew attention to the importance of the coalfields of Shandong, and of Kiaochow as a port.

In 1875, he was appointed professor of geology at the University of Bonn, but being fully occupied with his work in China he did not take up professorial duties until 1879. In 1883, he became professor of geography at the University of Leipzig, and professor of geography at the Friedrich Wilhelm University of Berlin in 1886. He occupied the latter position until his death. His lectures attracted numerous students who subsequently became eminent in geographical work, and in order to keep in touch with them he established his weekly geographical “colloquium.” Among his most famous students was Sven Hedin, the Swedish explorer. He served as president of the German Geographical Society for many years and founded the Berlin Hydrographical Institute.

He is noted for coining the terms "Seidenstraße" and "Seidenstraßen" = "Silk Road(s)" or "Silk Route(s)" in 1877. He also standardized the practices of chorography and chorology.

He died in 1905 in Berlin.

Anecdotes
When William Gill consulted him about a planned trip to China, he remarked:

The mountain range on the southern edge of the Hexi Corridor in western China was named Richthofen Range after him, although the modern name is now Qilian Mountains.  The 12940 ft. Mount Richthofen in Rocky Mountain National Park is also named after him.

Publications

In German
 “Die Kalkalpen von Vorarlberg und Nordtirol” in Jahrbuch der geologischen Reichsanstalt; 1859–1861
 “Die Metallproduktion Kaliforniens” in Petermanns Mitteilungen; 1865
 China, Ergebnisse eigner Reisen und darauf gegründeter Studien (China: The results of my travels and the studies based thereon), 1877–1912, 5 vols. and atlas
 Aufgaben und Methoden der heutigen Geographie (an address delivered at Leipzig, 1883)
 Führer für Forschungsreisende (A guide for the traveling researcher), Berlin, 1886
 Triebkräfte und Richtungen der Erdkunde in neunzehnten Jahrhundert (address on his election as rector, Berlin, 1903)

In English 
 Comstock Lode: Its Character, and the Probable Mode of Its Continuance in Depth (1866)
 Principles of the Natural System of Volcanic Rocks (1867)
 Letters to the Shanghai Chamber of Commerce (1869–72)
 Richthofen, F. (1872). Letter from Baron Richthofen on the Province of Hunan. Shanghai: Re-printed at the "Ching-foong" Printing Office. State Library of New South Wales, TQ047868
 Richthofen, F. (1872).  Letter by Baron von Richthofen on the provinces of Chili, Shansi, Shensi, Sz'-chwan, with notes on Mongolia, Kansu, Yünnan and Kwei-chau. no. 7. Shanghai: Re-printed at the "Ching-foong" Printing Office. State Library of New South Wales, TQ047868
 Richthofen, F. (1872).  Letter by Baron von Richthofen, from Si-ngan-fu, on the rebellion in Kansu and Shensi. No. 6. Shanghai: Printed at the office of the 'North-China Herald'. State Library of New South Wales, TQ047868

Notes

References
 
 Hans-Dietrich Schultz: Ferdinand von Richthofen: The True Founder of Modern Geography?. In: Die Erde: Zeitschrift der Gesellschaft für Erdkunde zu Berlin. Volume 138, Issue 4 (2007), Special Issue "Ferdinand von Richtofen", pp. 333–352. (online)
 Ute Wardenga: Ferdinand von Richthofen - Then and Now. An Introduction. In: Die Erde: Zeitschrift der Gesellschaft für Erdkunde zu Berlin. Volume 138, Issue 4 (2007), Special Issue "Ferdinand von Richtofen", pp. 301–311. (online)
 Ute Wardenga: Ferdinand von Richthofen and the Development of German Geography. In: Die Erde: Zeitschrift der Gesellschaft für Erdkunde zu Berlin. Volume 138, Issue 4 (2007), Special Issue "Ferdinand von Richtofen", pp. 313–332. (online)

External links

1833 births
1905 deaths
People from Namysłów County
People from the Province of Silesia
Silk Road
Barons of Germany
German geographers
Ferdinand von Richthofen
University of Breslau alumni
Humboldt University of Berlin alumni
German expatriates in China
Academic staff of the Humboldt University of Berlin
Academic staff of the University of Bonn
Academic staff of Leipzig University
Wollaston Medal winners
Foreign Members of the Royal Society
Foreign associates of the National Academy of Sciences